Castiarina alexandri is a species of beetle in the Buprestidae family, which is endemic to Australia.

References

alexandri
Beetles described in 1916